is a national university located in the Japanese cities of Yamagata, Yonezawa, and Tsuruoka in Yamagata Prefecture.

The Times Higher Education released World University Rankings 2016–2017. Yamagata University ranked 600-800th out of the top 980 universities in the world.

In addition, YU is ranked the tenth place (10th) in Japanese research organization ranking, announcement in April 2017, by the analysis of the number of the highly cited papers in a "Materials Science" field alone in the Japanese local national university. Ranking by Thomson Reuters

The university also has other roots: the  founded in 1910 in Yonezawa City, the  founded in 1920 in Yamagata City, the  founded in 1922 in Yamagata City, and the  founded in 1947 in Tsuruoka City.

Yamagata University is the second-largest university in the Tohoku Region. 
The university has six faculties and about 10,000 students in four campuses. It also has an additional subcampus in which University K-9 schools are administered.

History 

The Imperial Japan (Meiji) Government decided to merge the "old" Yamagata, Okitama, and Tsuruoka Prefectures into one new Yamagata Prefecture in August 1876. Each of the former three prefectures had its own normal schools, but these were closed with the discontinuance of their administrative bodies. The direct institutional history dates back to 1877 when the Congress of new Yamagata Prefecture authorized an establishment of a new public teacher-training institution, Yamagata Prefectural Normal School, which was founded in September 1878 in Hatago-machi, Yamagata City.

Meanwhile, Yonezawa Higher Technical School, the first national school of higher education in the prefecture, was founded in 1910. The institute was the seventh National Higher Technical School in Japan following the establishment of Tokyo, Osaka, Kyoto, Nagoya, Kumamoto, and Sendai Higher Technical Schools. It was renamed the Yonezawa Engineering College under reformation of the law in 1944.

Ten years after the establishment of the Yonezawa Higher Technical School, another national school of higher education was founded (1920) in Yamagata Prefecture, Yamagata Higher School, located in Yamagata City and the 14th national higher school in Japan. 
During World War II, the United States' bombers destroyed the Komagome laboratories of the Japanese science research institute RIKEN, and it was evacuated to several local cities (Kanazawa, Osaka and Yamagata) as the situation worsened. 
One of the evacuations sites was Yamagata Higher School.

The National Yonezawa Higher Technical School and Yamagata Higher School were both prestigious schools at the time and played a central role when Yamagata University was established after World War II. The two schools produced a number of exceptional graduates, and alumni numbered about 5,500 and 5,000, respectively.

To meet the growing needs of primary and secondary education, Yamagata Prefecture founded one more public teacher-training institution, the Yamagata Prefectural Teacher's School for Vocational Supplementary Education, in 1922. 
The school developed and was renamed the Yamagata Youth Teachers School when control was transferred to the Japanese  in 1944. 
Yamagata Prefectural Agriculture and Forestry School, founded in 1947 in Tsuruoka City, was also one of the predecessors of current Yamagata University.

Yamagata University was established on 31 May 1949 following the National School Establishment Law. 
Five old institutions of higher education in Yamagata Prefecture were integrated to form the new university: Yamagata Normal School founded in 1878, Yonezawa Engineering College founded in 1910, Yamagata Higher School founded in 1920, Yamagata Youth Teachers School founded in 1922, and Yamagata Prefectural Agriculture and Forestry School founded in 1947. 
The new university had a Faculty of Literature and Sciences, a Faculty of Education, a Faculty of Engineering, and a Faculty of Agriculture.

In 2006, Yuki Akio became the new university president in an election that caused much acrimony and hit the national press. Although he did not win the popular vote, a cabal of non-university Election Committee members forced through his nomination. Yuki was a civil servant at the Japanese Ministry of Education at the time and his appointment attracted much criticism for being a case of amakudari, a corrupt practice the government had vowed to stamp out.

List of events

Campuses and colleges 

Yamagata University has four main campuses, Yamagata-Kojirakawa, Yamagata-Iida, Yonezawa and Tsuruoka. 
Approximately 10,000 students are enrolled, including 177 international students. 
Yamagata-Matsunami Campus has no research facility except for Teacher Training Research Center; there exists University K-9 schools. 
Also the university has the Tokyo Satellite Center (3-3-6-503 Shibaura, Minato, Tokyo 108-0023, Japan).

Campuses 
 Kojirakawa Campus (1-4-12 Kojirakawa-machi, Yamagata 990-8560, Japan)

 Administration Bureau
 Faculty of Education, Art and Science
Primary Education course
Music course
Art course
Sports course
Intercultural Studies course
Food Science and Nutrition course
Environment and Space Design course
Systems Science and Information Studies course
 Faculty of Literature and Social Sciences
 Faculty of Science
 University Library
 University Museum
 Cooperative Research Center (Yamagata Satellite)
 Education Center for Foreign Language
 Information Center
 International Center
 Networking and Computing Service Center (Yamagata Branch)
 Radioisotope Laboratory
 Research Center for Higher Education
 Teacher Training Research Center
 Health Administration Center
 Gymnasium

 Iida Campus (2-2-2 Iida-nishi, Yamagata 990-9585, Japan)

 Faculty of Medicine
 University Hospital
 University Library (Medical Branch)
 Central Laboratory for Research and Education
 Environmental Preservation Center
 Laboratory Animal Center
 Radioisotope Laboratory
 Research Laboratory for Molecular Genetics
 Special School Attached to the University
 Gymnasium

 Yonezawa Campus (4-3-16 Jonan, Yonezawa 992-8510, Japan)
 Faculty of Engineering
 University Library (Engineering Branch)
 Cooperative Research Center
 Incubation Center
 Networking and Computing Service Center
 Venture Business Laboratory (VBL)
 Health Administration Center (Yonezawa Branch)
 Gymnasium

 Tsuruoka Campus (1–23 Wakaba-machi, Tsuruoka 997-8555, Japan)
 Faculty of Agriculture
 University Farm
 University Forest
 University Library (Agricultural Branch)
 Networking and Computing Service Center (Tsuruoka Branch)
 Research Laboratory for Molecular Genetics (Tsuruoka Branch)
 Research Laboratory for Radioisotope (Tsuruoka Branch)
 Health Administration Center (Tsuruoka Branch)
 Gymnasium

Faculties 
Yamagata University consists of six faculties:
 Faculty of Literature and Social Sciences
 Faculty of Education, Art and Science
 Faculty of Science
 Faculty of Medicine
 Faculty of Engineering
 Faculty of Agriculture

Graduate schools 
Yamagata University consists of six graduate schools and a united graduate course:
 Graduate School of Social and Cultural Systems
 Graduate School of Education
 Graduate School of Science
 Graduate School of Medicine
 Graduate School of Engineering
 Graduate School of Agricultural Sciences
 The United Graduate Course of Agricultural Sciences

Research facilities 
  University Farm
 University Forest
 University Hospital
 University Libraries (Central, Medical, Engineering, Agricultural)
 University Museum
 Central Laboratory for Research and Education
 Cooperative Research Centers (Yonezawa Center, Yamagata Satellite)
 Education Center for Foreign Language
 Environmental Preservation Center
 Incubation Center
 Information Center
 International Center
 Laboratory Animal Center
 Networking and Computing Service Centers [NCSC] (Yamagata Center, Yonezawa, Iida and Tsuruoka)
 Radioisotope Laboratory (Yamagata Center, Iida and Tsuruoka)
 Research Laboratories for Molecular Genetics (Iida Center and Tsuruoka)
 Research Center for Higher Education
 Teacher Training Research Center
 Teacher Training Research Center
 Venture Business Laboratory [VBL]

Other facilities 
 University Gymnasia (Yamagata, Iida, Yonezawa and Tsuruoka)
 Health Administration Centers (Yamagata, Yonezawa and Tsuruoka)
 University-Attached Schools (Kindergarten, Elementary School, Junior High School and Special School)

Affiliations 

Yamagata University is affiliated with 48 universities and institutes in 18 countries. The University maintains international exchange agreements with 25 institutions in nine different countries (2007).

Inter-University Agreement

Inter-Faculty Agreement

Notable people and alumni 

 Yasushi Akashi (1931–) – Yamagata Higher School (1950), Diplomat and UN administrator
 Takeo Doi (1904–1996) – Yamagata Higher School (1925), Aircraft Designer, He designed Kawasaki Ki-10, Ki-61, Ki-100 and NAMC YS-11.
 Michiro Endō (1950–) – Yamagata University (1973), Musician
 Shūhei Fujisawa (1927–1997) – Yamagata Normal School (1949), Author
 Yatarō Mishima (1867–1919) – Yamagata Prefectural Normal School (1882), 8th President of the Bank of Japan, Senator, House of Peers of the Japanese Imperial Diet
 Shichirō Murayama (1908–1995) – Yamagata Higher School (1929), Linguist
 Mikio Narita (1935–1990) – Faculty of Literature and Sciences (1959), Actor
 Yoshihiro Togashi (1966–) – Faculty of Education (1988), Manga artist
 Takaaki Yoshimoto (1924–) – Yonezawa Higher Technical School (1945), Poet, literary critic, and philosopher

Points of interest 
 Main Building of Yonezawa Higher Technical School (a designated national Important Cultural Property)
4-3-16 Jonan, Yonezawa 992-8510, Japan (Yonezawa Campus, Yamagata University)
 Education Museum of Yamagata Prefectural Museum (ex- Main Building of Yamagata Prefectural Normal School, one of the Japanese "Designated National Important Cultural Properties")
2-2-8 Midori-cho, Yamagata 990-0041, Japan
 Auditorium of Yamagata Prefectural Yamagata North High School (ex- Music Hall of Yamagata Prefectural Normal School, one of the Prefectural "Designated Important Cultural Properties")
2-2-7 Midori-cho, Yamagata 990-0041, Japan

References

External links 

 Yamagata University Home Page
 Faculty of Agriculture, Yamagata University Home Page 
 Faculty of Engineering, Yamagata University Home Page
 Faculty of Medicine, Yamagata University Home Page

Educational institutions established in 1949
Universities and colleges in Yamagata Prefecture
Japanese national universities
1949 establishments in Japan
Yonezawa, Yamagata
Tsuruoka, Yamagata